Latina is the fifteenth studio album by Mexican recording artist Thalía, released on May 6, 2016, by Sony Music Latin. The album consists of 13 tracks, including collaborations with Maluma, Silvestre Dangond, De La Ghetto, OMI, Jacob Forever and Chiky Bom Bom "La Pantera". Latina is Thalia's recent studio album since 2014's Amore Mio. The album was praised by music critics' and well received commercially receiving Platinum certifications in both Mexico and United States.

Background and production
Latina represents Thalía's return eighteen months after the release of her previous album, Amore Mio. It is the first time that Thalía has worked with producer Sergio George and the sixth that has worked with Cory Rooney that produced Arrasando (2000), Thalía (2002), Thalía (2003), Thalía's Hits Remixed (2003) and El Sexto Sentido (2005). Latina pre-production started in August 2015, five months after the launch of her Macy's clothing collection, which would be launched in January 2016. Latina recording started around November 2015 and post-production in January 2016, ending on February 17, 2016. On February 27, almost a month after the release of the first single "Desde Esa Noche" and ten days after the end of the recordings, Thalía publicized the album's cover and its name.

Singles
The lead single “Desde Esa Noche” featuring Maluma was released on January 29, 2016, meeting huge success and landing at the #4 spot on the Latin Pop chart, published by Billboard, while it also became a smash hit all over Latin America and Spain. The music video of "Desde Esa Noche" premiered on Thalia's VEVO account on March 18.

The second single of the album, 'Vuélveme a Querer' was released on April 29, 2016. The song had airplay success throughout Latin America and was certified Gold in Mexico.

On December 2, 2016 "Todavía Te Quiero" was released as the third and final single of the album.

Despite not being released as an official or promotional single, the song "De Ti" featuring Silvestre Dangond peaked at number 17 in the Latin pop charts in Ecuador and was the 70th most played song of 2016 on pop radios in Venezuela.

Commercial performance
The album sold 3,000 in United States in its first week of release, peaking the top-spot and earning Thalía's fourth No. 1 on Top Latin Albums chart.

Critical response

Upon its release, Latina has received mostly positive reviews from the majority of music critics, who praised her artistic confidence and vocal performance, as well as the overall production of the album. All music gave the album 4 out 5 stars. Latina was nominated for a Lo Nuestro Award for Pop Album of the Year.

Track listing

Personnel
Credits in alphabetical order.

Charts

Weekly charts

Year-end charts

Certifications and sales

Release history

References

2016 albums
Spanish-language albums
Thalía albums
Albums produced by Sergio George
Sony Music Latin albums